In Greek mythology, Styx is a river that forms the boundary between Earth (Gaia) and the Underworld. The rivers Acheron, Cocytus, Lethe, Phlegethon, and Styx all converge at the centre of the underworld on a great marsh, which sometimes is also called the Styx. According to Herodotus, the river Styx originates near Pheneus. Styx is also known as the goddess of the river, the source of its miraculous powers.

Infernal river 
The deities of the Greek pantheon swore all their oaths upon the river Styx because, according to Greek mythology, during the Titanomachy, Styx, the goddess of the river, sided with Zeus. After the war, Zeus declared that every oath must be sworn upon her. Zeus swore to give Semele whatever she wanted and was then obliged to follow through when he realized to his horror that her request would lead to her death. Helios similarly promised his son Phaëton whatever he desired, also resulting in the boy's death. Myths related to such early deities did not survive long enough to be included in historic records, but tantalizing references exist among those that have been discovered.

According to some versions, the river Styx had miraculous powers which could make someone who bathed in the waters invulnerable. According to one tradition, Achilles' mother dipped him in the river during his childhood and he thus acquired invulnerability, with the exception of the heel by which his mother held him. Achilles was struck and killed during the Trojan War by an arrow shot into his heel by Paris. This is the source of the expression "Achilles' heel", a metaphor for a vulnerable spot.

Styx was primarily a feature in the afterworld of classical Greek mythology. The ferryman Charon is sometimes described as having transported the souls of the newly dead across this river into the Underworld, although in many sources it is instead the Acheron which Charon crosses and which is at the entrance of the Underworld. The further down the Styx people were carried, the longer and/or more severe would be their punishment. Dante, putting Charon and the Acheron at the entrance to Hell, put Phlegyas as ferryman over the Styx and made it the fifth circle of Hell, where the wrathful and sullen are punished by being drowned in the muddy waters for eternity, with the wrathful fighting each other.

Most historical accounts, including Pausanias (10.28) and later Dante's Inferno (3.78), associate Charon with the river Acheron. Ancient Greek literary sources – such as Pindar, Aeschylus, Euripides, Plato, and Callimachus – also place Charon on the Acheron. Roman poets, including Propertius, Ovid, and Statius, name the river as the Styx, perhaps following the geography of Virgil's underworld in the Aeneid, where Charon is associated with both rivers. 
 
In ancient times some believed that a coin (Charon's obol) placed in the mouth of a dead person would pay the toll for the ferry across the river to the entrance of the Underworld. It was said that if someone could not pay the fee, they would never be able to cross the river. The ritual was performed by the relatives of the dead. According to the myth Narcissus is still admiring himself in the Underworld, looking at the waters of the Styx.

The variant spelling Stix was sometimes used in translations of Classical Greek before the 20th century. By metonymy, the adjective stygian came to refer to anything dark, dismal, and murky.

Nymph
Styx was the name of an Oceanid nymph, one of the three thousand daughters of the Titans Oceanus and his sister-wife Tethys, and the goddess of the River Styx. Others make her one of the progenies of the primordial gods, Nyx (Night) and Erebus (Darkness). In classical myths, Styx's husband was Pallas and she gave birth to Zelus, Nike, Kratos, and Bia (and sometimes Eos and Selene). Another source, adds Scylla, the Fontes (Fountains), and the Lacus (Lakes) as their children. Styx also mothered Echidna by Peiras and even Persephone by Zeus in one account.

Mythology 
In these myths, Styx supported Zeus in the Titanomachy, where she was said to be the first to rush to his aid. For this reason, her name was given the honour of being a binding oath for the deities. Knowledge of whether this was the original reason for the tradition did not survive into historical records following the religious transition that led to the pantheon of the classical era.

Moon
On 2 July 2013, "Styx" officially became the name of one of Pluto's moons. The other moons of Pluto (Charon, Nix, Hydra, and Kerberos) also have names from Greco-Roman mythology related to the underworld.

Gallery

See also
Gjöll - Norse mythology
Hitpun - Mandaean mythology
Hubur - Mesopotamian mythology
Sanzu River - Japanese Buddhism
Vaitarna River (mythological) - Hinduism and Buddhism

Notes

References 

 Apollodorus, The Library with an English Translation by Sir James George Frazer, F.B.A., F.R.S. in 2 Volumes, Cambridge, MA, Harvard University Press; London, William Heinemann Ltd. 1921. ISBN 0-674-99135-4. Online version at the Perseus Digital Library. Greek text available from the same website.
 Callimachus, Callimachus and Lycophron with an English translation by A. W. Mair ; Aratus, with an English translation by G. R. Mair, London: W. Heinemann, New York: G. P. Putnam 1921. Internet Archive
 Callimachus, Works. A.W. Mair. London: William Heinemann; New York: G.P. Putnam's Sons. 1921. Greek text available at the Perseus Digital Library.
 
 Gaius Julius Hyginus, Fabulae from The Myths of Hyginus translated and edited by Mary Grant. University of Kansas Publications in Humanistic Studies. Online version at the Topos Text Project.
 Herodotus, The Histories with an English translation by A. D. Godley. Cambridge. Harvard University Press. 1920. . Online version at the Topos Text Project. Greek text available at Perseus Digital Library.
 Hesiod, Theogony from The Homeric Hymns and Homerica with an English Translation by Hugh G. Evelyn-White, Cambridge, MA.,Harvard University Press; London, William Heinemann Ltd. 1914. Online version at the Perseus Digital Library. Greek text available from the same website.
 Homer, The Iliad with an English Translation by A.T. Murray, Ph.D. in two volumes. Cambridge, MA., Harvard University Press; London, William Heinemann, Ltd. 1924. . Online version at the Perseus Digital Library.
 Homer, Homeri Opera in five volumes. Oxford, Oxford University Press. 1920. . Greek text available at the Perseus Digital Library.
 The Homeric Hymns and Homerica with an English Translation by Hugh G. Evelyn-White. Homeric Hymns. Cambridge, MA.,Harvard University Press; London, William Heinemann Ltd. 1914. Online version at the Perseus Digital Library. Greek text available from the same website.
Pausanias, Description of Greece with an English Translation by W.H.S. Jones, Litt.D., and H.A. Ormerod, M.A., in 4 Volumes. Cambridge, MA, Harvard University Press; London, William Heinemann Ltd. 1918. . Online version at the Perseus Digital Library
Pausanias, Graeciae Descriptio. 3 vols. Leipzig, Teubner. 1903.  Greek text available at the Perseus Digital Library.

Underworld goddesses
Oceanids
Naiads
Rivers of Hades
Children of Nyx
Deeds of Zeus
Mythological rivers
Oaths
Greek underworld
Divine women of Zeus
Chthonic beings
Sea and river goddesses